Wild Desire (Turkish: Vahşi Arzu) is a 1953 Turkish drama film directed by Enver Burçkin and starring Ayhan Işık, Mesiha Yelda and Ahmet Tarik Tekçe.

Cast
 Ayhan Işık 
 Mesiha Yelda 
 Ahmet Tarik Tekçe 
 Zeki Alpan

References

Bibliography
 Türker İnanoğlu. 5555 afişle Türk Sineması. Kabalcı, 2004.

External links
 

1953 films
1953 drama films
1950s Turkish-language films
Turkish drama films
Turkish black-and-white films